Gates Pass is a mountain pass along the crest of the Tucson Mountains. The road through the pass is a scenic route west of Tucson, Arizona. The road from the east is West Anklam Road which merges with West Speedway Boulevard in the city just east of North Camino De Oeste. West of the pass the road is known as Saguaro Road and continues until it reaches Kinney Road just north of Old Tucson.

The road is lined with scenic overlooks, and is an area where locals and tourists come to watch the sunset.

History
The road through Gates Pass was started in 1883 by Thomas Gates, in a search for a shortcut through the Tucson Mountains; Gates was a local pioneer, and a saloon and ranch keeper. He purchased the land in order to build this road.

Currently, the road carries approximately 3100 cars daily.

Gates Pass was featured in David Leighton's popular series, "Street Smarts," in the Arizona Daily Star on Jan. 1, 2013.

Safety
Gates Pass has been considered an extremely dangerous road due to a slope that occurs midway through the route, with 58 wrecks reported between 1996 and 2001. In 2006, a project was undertaken to improve the safety of the road, which included widening and a temporary closure. This project was named the third best road project in the country for the year 2006 in Roads and Bridges Magazine.

References

External links
 Gates Pass on Google Maps with Street View mode
 YouTube video of ride along Gates Pass
 Gates Pass Area Neighborhood Association
 David Leighton, Street smarts: Gates paid for road himself to speed trip, Arizona Daily Star, Jan. 1, 2013

Roads in Arizona
Transportation in Tucson, Arizona
Hiking trails in Arizona
Landmarks in Tucson, Arizona
Parks in Arizona
Tourist attractions in Pima County, Arizona
Protected areas of Arizona
Mountain passes of Arizona
Landforms of Pima County, Arizona